Kim Umback is a Canadian cross-country skier. She represented Canada at the 1988 Winter Paralympics and she competed in three events in cross-country skiing.

She won the bronze medal in the women's 3x5 km relay B1-3 event together with Sandra Lecour and Tricia Lovegrove.

She also competed in the women's short distance 5 km B2 and women's long distance 10 km B2 events.

She was diagnosed with Leber's congenital amaurosis.

References 

Living people
Year of birth missing (living people)
Place of birth missing (living people)
Canadian female cross-country skiers
Cross-country skiers at the 1988 Winter Paralympics
Medalists at the 1988 Winter Paralympics
Paralympic bronze medalists for Canada
Paralympic cross-country skiers of Canada
Paralympic medalists in cross-country skiing